Nicolas Cleynaerts (Clenardus or Clenard) (5 December 1495 – 1542) was a Flemish grammarian and traveler. He was born in Diest, in the Duchy of Brabant.

Life
Cleynaerts was a follower of Jan Driedo. Educated at the University of Leuven, he became a professor of Latin, which he taught by the conversational method.

A desire to read the Koran led him to try to establish a connection between Hebrew and Arabic. These studies resulted in a scheme for proselytism among the Arabs, based on study of the language, which should enable Europeans to combat Islam by peaceful methods. In pursuit of this, he travelled to Spain in 1532, and after teaching Greek at Salamanca was summoned to the court of Portugal as tutor to Dom Henrique, brother of João III.

He found another patron in Louis Mendoza, marquis of Mondéjar, governor general of Granada. There with the help of a Moorish slave he gained a knowledge of Arabic. He tried in vain to gain access to the Arabic manuscripts in the possession of the Spanish Inquisition, and finally, in 1540, set out for Africa to seek information for himself.

He reached Fez, then a flourishing seat of Arab learning, but after fifteen months of privation and suffering was obliged to return to Granada, and died in the autumn of 1542. He was buried in the Alhambra.

Works
Cleynaerts applied himself to the preparation of manuals of Greek and Hebrew grammar, in order to simplify the difficulties of learners. His Tabulae in grammaticen hebraeam (1529), Institutiones in linguam graecam (1530), and Meditationes graecanicae (1531) appeared at Leuven. The Institutiones and Meditationes passed through a number of editions, and had many commentators. He maintained a principle revived in modern teaching, that the learner should not be puzzled by elaborate rules until he has obtained a working acquaintance with the language.

References

Notes

Further reading
 Latin letters to his friends in Flanders, Nicolai Clenardi, Peregrinationum ac de rebus machometicis epistolae elegantissimae (Leuven, 1550), and a more complete edition, Nic. Clenardi Epistolarum libri duo (Antwerp, 1566), from the house of Plantin; 
 Victor Chauvin and Alphonse Roersch, "Etude sur la vie et les travaux de Nicolas Clenard" in Mémoires couronnes (vol. lx., 1900–1901) of the Royal Academy of Belgium, which contains information on Cleynaerts and an extensive bibliography of his works.
 "A Scholar and Traveller of the Renaissance", review of Nic. Clenardi Epistolarum libri duo in The Quarterly Review 1893, vol. 176, p. 140-165.

1495 births
1542 deaths
16th-century Latin-language writers
Flemish Renaissance humanists
Flemish writers (before 1830)
Language teachers
Lexicographers
People from Diest
Slave owners
Grammarians of Hebrew
Grammarians of Ancient Greek
Old University of Leuven alumni
French male non-fiction writers